The International African Friends of Abyssinia (IAFA), also known as the International African Friends of Ethiopia, was an organisation established in 1935 in London, England, to protest against Italian aggression against Abyssinia (see Second Italo-Ethiopian War). Its membership was composed of many important Pan-African figures, several of whom later formed the International African Service Bureau.

History
The International African Friends of Abyssinia (IAFA) was founded by C. L. R. James with assistance from fellow West Indians Amy Ashwood Garvey and Chris Brathwaite. IAFA's first public meeting was held on 23 July 1935, with another public meeting taking place days later on Sunday, 28 July, at Memorial Hall in Farringdon Street, London, and was widely reported in newspapers. George Padmore and Ras Makonnen joined IAFA soon after its founding. Throughout the summer of 1935, the IAFA passed resolutions urging all Africans and people of African descent to help Abyssinia and called upon the League of Nations and the British Government to protect Abyssinia. On 26 August, the IAFA organised a rally in Trafalgar Square which drew a crowd of nearly five hundred supporters.

Notable members 

Members of the initial executive committee of the International African Friends of Abyssinia included:

 C. L. R. James – Chairman
 Dr Peter Milliard and T. Albert Marryshow – Vice-Chairmen
 Jomo Kenyatta – Honorary Secretary
 Amy Ashwood Garvey – Honorary Treasurer
 Sam Manning
 Mohammed Said
 G. E. Moore
 S. R. Wood
 Dr J. B. Danquah
 John Payne 

Other leading members came to include George Padmore, Chris Braithwaite and T. Ras Makonnen.

References

Further reading
 Daniel James Whittall, "Creolising London: Black West Indian activism and the politics of race and empire in Britain, 1931-1948". Thesis, Royal Holloway, University of London.
 Christian Høgsbjerg, "The African diaspora: global solidarity in inter-war Britain", 20th & 21st Century Migrations

Pan-Africanist organizations in Europe
Pan-Africanism in the United Kingdom